Benjamin Alard (born 13 July 1985, Rouen, France) is a French classical organist, harpsichordist and clavichordist.

Biography

Studies and competitions 

Benjamin Alard's principal passion has always been the music of Johann Sebastian Bach and it was for his interpretation of this great composer that he was awarded First Prize and Prize of the audience in the 2004 International Harpsichord Competition in Bruges.

While still quite young he began studying music in his hometown in Dieppe, France. He was soon drawn to the organ and entered the Conservatory of Rouen where he studied with Louis Thiry and François Ménissier.

He was first introduced to the harpsichord by Elizabeth Joyé, with whom he studied in Paris before going on, in 2003, to the Schola Cantorum in Basel to work with Jörg-Andreas Bötticher, Jean-Claude Zehnder and Andrea Marcon.

Career 

Since 2005 he has been organist of the Bernard Aubertin organ in the church of Saint-Louis-en-l'Île in Paris where each season he gives concerts about the music of Bach.

Today Benjamin Alard divides his time between performing recitals and Chamber music on both the harpsichord and organ. He often performs repertoire for two harpsichords with Elisabeth Joyé, in duo with the violinist François Fernandez or in trio but also with flautist Emmanuel Pahud. He is regularly invited to perform as soloist or concertist in music series in Europe, Japan and North America.

Benjamin Alard performs regularly in principal musical centers world-wide, from Paris to Moscow and Saint-Peterbourg (Mariinsky Theatre) and further afield, to Tokyo, Washington, San Diego, Boston, Madrid, Barcelona, Switzerland or Belgium.

Discography 

Benjamin Alard has recorded for the label Hortus and has made several recordings of works by J.S. Bach for Alpha Classics (Trio Sonatas, Clavier-Übung I and II). His recordings have consistently received high praise from the press and have been awarded multiple prizes.
He now devotes himself to the complete works for harpsichord and organ solo of Johann Sebastian Bach for harmonia mundi. Seven boxes, of 18, are already available. The artistic approach of Benjamin Alard, as well as his huge project, have been widely acclaimed by classical magazines and cultural medias around the world.
In October 2022, harmonia mundi has published the seventh volume dedicated to Bach's "Orgelbüchlein".

Johann Sebastian Bach (1685-1750): The Complete Works for Keyboard 

 Volume 7: Orgelbüchlein (Little Organ Book) BWV 599-644 - Benjamin Alard, Organ Quentin Blumenroeder 2009 (Temple du Foyer de l’Âme, Paris); Ensemble Vocal Bergamasque and Marine Fribourg (direction); Maîtrise Notre Dame de Paris, Children's Choir and Émilie Fleury (direction). (2 CD, harmonia mundi, October 2022).
 Volume 6: The Well-Tempered Clavier, Book 1 (1720) BWV 846-869, marking the work’s 300th anniversary. Programme Supplements: Little keyboard book for Wilhelm Friedemann Bach; 6 Preludes for beginners on the keyboard BWV 933-938 assigned to Wilhelm Friedemann Bach - Benjamin Alard, Historical Harpsichord Hicronymus Albrecht Haas (Hamburg, 1740), Musée instrumental de Provins, France / Clavichord Johann Adolph Hasse (Hamburg, 1763), Musée instrumental de Provins, France. (3CD, harmonia mundi, March 2022). Press awards: Editor's Choice May 2022 and Best Classical Music Album of the Year 2022 on Gramophone (UK), Diapason d'Or (FR), ***** Classica (FR).
 Volume 5: Toccata - Weimar 1708-1717 - Toccatas BWV 565, 910, 911, 916; Toccatas & Fugues BWV 538, 540; Preludes and fugues BWV 536a, 543 & 543/1a, 545, 895; Concertos BWV 981, 982, 985, 987 after Georg Philipp Telemann, Prince Johann Ernst of Saxe-Weimar an Benedetto Marcello, etc. Benjamin Alard, Organ Quentin Blumenroeder 2009 (Temple du Foyer de l’Âme, Paris) / Pedal harpsichord Philippe Humeau (Barbaste, 1993), after Carl Conrad Fleischer (Hamburg, 1720) / Clavichord Émile Jobin (1998), after Christian Gottfried Friederici Gera (1773), Cité de la Musique - Philharmonie de Paris, France. (3CD, harmonia mundi, November 2021). Press awards: ***** Classica (FR), ***** Rivista Musica (IT).
 Volume 4: Alla Veneziana – Concerti Italiani: Organ Concertos BWV 592-94, 596; Concertos BWV 972-76, 978-80 after Antonio Vivaldi and Alessandro Marcello; Preludes 8 & Fugues BWV 535 & 894; Fantasia and Fugue BWV 944; Fugues, Trios, Chorale Preludes, etc. Benjamin Alard, Historical Harpsichord Mattia De Gand (Roma (1702), restored by Graziano Bandini (Bologna, 2016), Museo Santa Caterina, Treviso (Italy) / Pedal harpsichord Philippe Humeau (Barbaste, 1993), after Carl Conrad Fleischer (Hamburg, 1720) - Quentin Blumenroeder (Haguenau, 2017) / Historical Organ Andreas Silbermann (1710), restored by Quentin Blumenroeder (Haguenau, 2010), Abbaye Saint-Étienne, Marmoutier (France). (3CD, harmonia mundi, January 2021). Press award: ***** Classica (FR), Scherzo Excepcional (SP).
 Volume 3: In the French Style - ‘À la française’, ‘Allein Gott in der Höh sei Ehr’, ‘La Suite de danses’. Programme Supplements: works by Johann Caspar Ferdinand Fischer, François Couperin, Nicolas de Grigny, André Raison. Benjamin Alard, Historical Harpsichord, early eighteenth century, from Château d’Assas (France) / Historical Organ Andreas Silbermann (1710), from Abbaye Saint-Étienne, Marmoutier (France) / Harpsichord Philippe Humeau (1989), after Carl Conrad Fleischer (c. 1720). (3CD, harmonia mundi, April 2020). Press awards: Preis der deutschen Schallplattenkritik 2020 (DE), Album of the year 2020 from Gramophone (UK), ***** Classica (FR), Scherzo Excepcional (SP).
 Volume 2: Towards the North, 1705-1708 - Lübeck, Hamburg, Erbarm dich mein, The Traveler. Programme Supplements: works by Buxtehude, Reincken, Pachelbel. Benjamin Alard, organ Freytag-Tricoteaux (2001) after Arp Schnitger (Church Saint-Vaast de Béthune, France) / Claviorganum Blumenroeder (2009-2010) / Harpsichord François Ciocca (Riccia, 2003) after Grimaldi (Messina, 1697) / organ Quentin Blumenroeder (Haguenau, 2010). (4CD, harmonia mundi, April 2019).
 Volume 1: The Young Heir, 1699-1705 - Ohrdruf, Lüneburg, Amstadt: Chorales, Fantasies, Preludes & Fugues, included Capriccio sopra la lontananza del suo fratello dilettissimo BWV 992. Programme Supplements: works by Johann Michael Bach, Johann Christoph Bach, Girolamo Frescobaldi, Johann Kuhnau, Georg Böhm, Johann Jakob Froberger, Johann Pachelbel, Louis Marchand, Nicolas de Grigny. Benjamin Alard, Historical organ Andreas Silbermann (1718), restored by Manufacture Blumenroeder (Saint Aurelia's Church, Strasbourg, France) / Harpsichord Émile Jobin after Rückers (1612) and Dulken (1747). Guest artist: Gerlinde Sämann, soprano. (3 CD, harmonia mundi, June 2018). Press award: Choc de Classica (FR).

Other harpsichord recordings 

 J.S. Bach: Clavier-Übung II - Italian Concerto, BWV 971, Overture in the French style, BWV 831 (2011, Alpha Classics  180)
 J.S. Bach: Clavier-Übung I - Partitas BWV 825-830 (2010, Alpha Classics  157)
 J.S. Bach: Sei Suonate a violino solo e cembalo concertato BWV 1014-1019 - with François Fernandez, violin and Philippe Pierlot, viola da gamba (2009, Flora 1909)
Bauyn manuscript: Works from Johann Jakob Froberger, Louis Couperin, Luigi Rossi, Girolamo Frescobaldi (2008, Hortus 065)
Benjamin Alard plays J.S. Bach: Bach's owns works transcribed by himself for harpsichord, Reincken and Vivaldi (2007, Hortus 050)

Other organ recordings 

J.S. Bach - Wachet auf!: Six Schübler Chorales BWV 645-650 and other works. Benjamin Alard, organ  Michel Giroud  from the Church Notre-Dame-de-l'Assomption of Arques-la-Bataille, France. (2016, coproduction L'Autre Monde - Académie Bach).
French Music from the 17th/18th-centuries: Works from Titelouze, Jacques Boyvin, François Couperin. Benjamin Alard, organ from the Church of Saint-Ouen, Pont-Audemer, France. (2010, Hortus 076)
 J.S. Bach: Organ Trio Sonatas BWV 525-530. Benjamin Alard, organ Aubertin from the Church Saint-Louis-en-l'Île, Paris. (2009, Alpha Classics 152)
 Andreas Bach Buch: Works from Dietrich Buxtehude, Johann Sebastian Bach, Johann Christian Fischer, Christian Ritter, Carlo Francesco Pollarolo, Johann Adam Reincken, Marin Marais. Benjamin Alard, organ Rémy Mahler from the Church Saint-Étienne-de-Baïgorry (2006, Hortus 045)

Artistic collaborations 

 Louis-Nicolas Clérambault: French cantatas, with Reinoud Van Mechelen and A Nocte Temporis Ensemble (2018, Alpha Classics 356)
 Johann Sebastian Bach: Erbarme dich, with Reinoud Van Mechelen and A Nocte Temporis Ensemble (2016, Alpha Classics 252)
 Georg Philipp Telemann: Concertos for trumpet and horn with La Petite Bande Ensemble (2016, Accent Records 24318)

References

External links 
 Benjamin Alard - Official website

1985 births
Living people
Musicians from Rouen
French harpsichordists
French classical organists
French male organists
21st-century French musicians
French performers of early music
21st-century organists
21st-century French male musicians
Male classical organists